Nicolás Pereira (born September 29, 1970) is a former tennis player from Venezuela, who became International Tennis Federation Junior World Champion in 1988 after winning the French Open, Wimbledon and the US Open.

Professional career 
In the fall of 1988, Pereira registered wins on the pro tour against Brad Gilbert and Amos Mansdorf. He finished 1988 ranked no. 151 in the world rankings.

In April 1989, Pereira reached the quarterfinals of the Tokyo Japan Open, beating no. 21 ranked Andrés Gómez, then lost to no. 1 ranked Ivan Lendl. In June, he beat world no. 3 Stefan Edberg in straight sets in the first round of the Queens Club grass court tournament.

A few weeks later, in the first round of Wimbledon, he took Lendl to five sets before losing. Later that summer, he reached the quarterfinals of the Grand Prix event at Montreal, the Canadian Open. There he beat no. 10 ranked Tim Mayotte, then lost to no. 14 ranked Jay Berger. Pereira, at 19 years of age, finished 1989 ranked no. 121.

However, Pereira's progress was stalled over the next three years. In 1990, he lost most of his matches in the first round of ATP level tournaments and finished the year ranked no. 238. In 1991, he did win the Lins and São Paulo-4 Challengers in back-to-back weeks, and was ranked no. 146 at year's end. He won the Guarujá Brazil Challenger in September 1992 and was ranked no. 138 at the end of the year.

In 1993, Pereira defeated Aaron Krickstein in the first round at the Bermuda Challenger. At the end of 1993, Pereira was ranked no. 141.

1994 marked a resurgence for Pereira. In March, he won the San Luis Potosí Challenger. At Wimbledon, he reached the second round where he lost a thrilling five set match to no. 18 Andre Agassi. In September, Pereira beat Mauricio Hadad at the ATP Bogotá to register his first ATP tournament title. He closed out 1994 ranked no. 110. 1995 was a mixed year for Pereira. In July, he won the Rio Brazil Challenger title by defeating João Cunha e Silva in straight sets. The next week at New Haven, he defeated MaliVai Washington in the second round, then lost to no. 10 Marc Rosset.

At the U.S. Open, Pereira reached the third round of a Grand Slam tournament for the first time. At the end of the year, Nicolas was ranked no. 134.

1996 was another inconsistent year for Pereira. He started the year well in Doha by qualifying, then beating world no. 5 Boris Becker 7–6, 6–7, 7–6 in round two. In March, Pereira again caused an upset when he beat world no. 1 Thomas Muster in straight sets at the Masters Series tournament in Key Biscayne, Florida. In July, Pereira won his second career ATP title when he beat Grant Stafford on the grass courts at Newport, Rhode Island.

He reached his highest singles ATP-ranking on July 22, 1996 when he became the no. 74 player in the world. He represented Venezuela at the 1996 Summer Olympics in Atlanta. Pereira finished the year ranked no. 110.  Pereira retired in September 1997.

ATP career finals

Singles: 2 (2 titles)

Doubles: 7 (3 titles, 4 runner-ups)

ATP Challenger and ITF Futures Finals

Singles: 10 (5–5)

Doubles: 14 (8–6)

Junior Grand Slam finals

Singles: 3 (3 titles)

Performance timelines

Singles

Doubles

See also
List of Grand Slam Boys' Singles champions

External links
 
 
 

1970 births
Living people
French Open junior champions
Olympic tennis players of Venezuela
People from Salto, Uruguay
Tennis players at the 1996 Summer Olympics
Venezuelan male tennis players
US Open (tennis) junior champions
Wimbledon junior champions
Pan American Games medalists in tennis
Pan American Games silver medalists for Venezuela
Tennis players at the 1995 Pan American Games
Grand Slam (tennis) champions in boys' singles
Central American and Caribbean Games medalists in tennis
Central American and Caribbean Games gold medalists for Venezuela
Central American and Caribbean Games bronze medalists for Venezuela